"Mr. Blue" is a popular song written by DeWayne Blackwell that was a hit for The Fleetwoods, reaching number one on the Billboard Hot 100 in November 1959, giving the group its second chart-topping hit of the year. Roy Lanham played guitar on the track, and Si Zentner played the trombone.

Chart positions

All-time charts

Other versions 
The song was covered in 1959 by David MacBeth, whose Joe Meek produced version reached number 18 on the UK Singles Chart, spending one week in the Top 20.

See also
List of Hot 100 number-one singles of 1959 (U.S.)

References

1959 singles
The Fleetwoods songs
Garth Brooks songs
Billboard Hot 100 number-one singles
Cashbox number-one singles
Songs written by Dewayne Blackwell
1959 songs
1950s ballads
Pop ballads